KCE may refer to:

Kinetic capillary electrophoresis
King Country Energy, a New Zealand electricity company
Konami Computer Entertainment, Japan
Belgian Health Care Knowledge Centre